Shamash School was a high school in Baghdad of the Jewish educational system founded in 1928 until 1951. Some public figures from cultural, academic and intellectual backgrounds such as Sami Michael and Sasson Somekh completed their education in this school. The school was supported by the Anglo-Jewish Association, it had over 900 students at its peak enrollment in 1939. Maurice Plotnick, a British born headmaster, subsequently emigrated to the United States where he founded the Westchester Day School.

References

Defunct schools in Iraq
Schools in Baghdad
Educational institutions established in 1928
Educational institutions disestablished in 1951
Jewish schools
Jews and Judaism in Baghdad
1920s establishments in Iraq
1950s disestablishments in Iraq